Guy Phillipe Delparte (born August 30, 1949) is a Canadian retired professional ice hockey player. He played in 48 NHL games with the Colorado Rockies during the 1976–77 season. The rest of his career, which lasted from 1969 to 1981, was spent in the minor leagues. Delparte was born in Prince Albert, Saskatchewan.

Career statistics

Regular season and playoffs

External links

1949 births
Living people
Canadian expatriate ice hockey players in the United States
Canadian ice hockey defencemen
Colorado Rockies (NHL) players
Fransaskois people
Ice hockey people from Saskatchewan
Johnstown Jets players
London Knights players
Maine Mariners players
Montreal Canadiens draft picks
Nova Scotia Voyageurs players
Oklahoma City Blazers (1965–1977) players
Rhode Island Reds players
Sportspeople from Prince Albert, Saskatchewan
Springfield Indians players
St. Catharines Black Hawks players
Sudbury Wolves players